The Carter–Menil Human Rights Prize was established in 1986 by former United States president Jimmy Carter and US philanthropist Dominique de Menil to "promote the protection of human rights throughout the world." The foundation periodically gives out prizes of $100,000 to individuals and institutions that promote human rights. Carter is the chairman of the Prize Committee.

See also
 Carter Center
 Jimmy Carter

External links
 Official Prize page with partial list of recipients

References

Human rights awards
Jimmy Carter
Awards established in 1986